Fat Tong Mun is a channel in Sai Kung District of Hong Kong located between the southern tip of Clear Water Bay Peninsula and the northern tip of Tung Lung Chau.

See also

 List of channels in Hong Kong
 Tin Hau Temple, Joss House Bay

Channels of Hong Kong
Sai Kung District